Nikola Brahmane (born 10 September 1998) is a Latvian footballer who plays as a midfielder for Auda and the Latvia national team.

International career
Brahmane made her debut for the Latvia national team on 21 September 2021, coming on as a substitute for Sandra Voitāne against Northern Ireland.

References

1998 births
Living people
Women's association football midfielders
Latvian women's footballers
Latvia women's international footballers